Fishtail may refer to:

Biology 
The rearmost fish fin or caudal fin
Fishtail palm (genus Caryota)

Transportation 
Fishtailing, a problem in car handling
Fishtail Air, a helicopter airline based in Kathmandu, Nepal

Places 
Fishtail, Montana, a town
Fishtail Point, southernmost point of Shults Peninsula in Antarctica
Fishtail Lake, lake on Vancouver Island in British Columbia, Canada
Fishtail Rock, a geologic feature on Hoi Sham Island, a former island near Hong Kong
Fishtail Butte; see List of mountains in Stillwater County, Montana
Fishtail Lagoon, a body of water in the  Keyhaven, Pennington, Oxey and Normandy Marshes
Machapuchare, "Fish's Tail", a mountain in Nepal

Tools 
Fishtail (tool), a wood carving tool and for gardening
Fishtail gauge

Clothing 
Fishtail parka, a type of anorak such as the US Army's M-65 parka
Fishtail skirt
Fishtail back trousers, a high back design for trousers that is designed for use with Suspenders (American English, Canadian English) or braces (British English). 
Fishtail wrap, a style of folding or draping a sari
 Fishtail train, a flared train

Culture 
Fishtail (Quickstep), a Quickstep dance figure
A form of the scrollwork, graphic design

See also
Fish tale (disambiguation)
Lobster Trap and Fish Tail, mobile by American artist Alexander Calder
Fish Tail Blues, a blues song attributed to American musician Jelly Roll Morton